T. J. Logan (born September 3, 1994) is an American football running back. He was drafted by the Arizona Cardinals in the fifth round of the 2017 NFL Draft. He played college football at North Carolina.

Professional career

Arizona Cardinals
Logan was drafted by the Arizona Cardinals in the fifth round, 179th overall, in the 2017 NFL Draft. He was the 18th running back selected in that year's draft. Logan dislocated his wrist in the preseason and was ruled out for 12 weeks. He was placed on injured reserve on September 4, 2017.

On September 1, 2019, Logan was waived by the Cardinals.

Tampa Bay Buccaneers
On September 2, 2019, Logan was claimed off waivers by the Tampa Bay Buccaneers. He played in 12 games as the Buccaneers primary returner before being placed on injured reserve on December 10, 2019, with a fractured thumb.

Logan was placed on injured reserve again on August 23, 2020, after suffering a leg injury during training camp. He was moved to the reserve/COVID-19 list on November 20, 2020, and moved back to injured reserve on November 30.

New Orleans Breakers
On March 10, 2022, Logan was drafted by the New Orleans Breakers of the United States Football League. He was transferred to the team's inactive roster on April 30 due to a foot injury. He was released on May 6.

References

External links
Tampa Bay Buccaneers bio
North Carolina Tar Heels bio

1994 births
Living people
American football running backs
Arizona Cardinals players
North Carolina Tar Heels football players
Players of American football from Greensboro, North Carolina
Tampa Bay Buccaneers players
New Orleans Breakers (2022) players